Rory Christopher Patterson (born 16 July 1984) is a Northern Irish footballer who plays as a forward for Strabane Athletic and is the club's player-manager. He also played for the Northern Ireland national team. Having played youth football for Sion Swifts, Moorfield Celtic and Townsend United, Patterson joined Rochdale in 2002 before having spells with Radcliffe Borough and Mossley.

In 2005, he joined the newly formed club FC United of Manchester, where he stayed until 2008 becoming their all-time top goalscorer in the process, scoring 99 times. He subsequently joined up with Bradford Park Avenue before having a short spell with Droylsden. In 2009, he moved back to Northern Ireland to join Coleraine where he had a successful one season spell – scoring 30 league goals, and he subsequently joined Glentoran before moving back to England to join League One side Plymouth Argyle.

After a two-year spell with League of Ireland Premier Division club Derry City, Patterson moved to Western Australian side Cockburn City in January 2015, before returning to FC United of Manchester in October 2015. After another spell at Derry City he moved to Crusaders in August 2018. He signed for intermediate side Ballymacash Rangers in September 2019.

Early life
Patterson was born in Strabane, County Tyrone.

Club career
Patterson played junior football in his native Northern Ireland before becoming a trainee with Rochdale. Turning professional in the 2002 close season, Patterson's first team debut came in October 2002 as an 86th-minute substitute for Gareth Griffiths as Rochdale lost 1–0 at home to Bury in the Football League Trophy. He made his league debut the following month, again as a substitute, this time in the 64th minute for Lee McEvilly, as Rochdale lost 2–0 away to Oxford United. He made a further seven appearances, all in the Football League that season. Nine first team appearances came the following season, with Patterson released by Rochdale, despite being voted their 'Young Player of the Year'.

He joined Radcliffe Borough in July 2004. After an impressive start to the following season, his performances tailed off and he was released in November 2004, signing for Mossley.

Patterson signed for FC United of Manchester in 2005, and made 126 appearances and scoring 99 goals for the club in all competitions. He was promoted in all of his three seasons with F.C. United and twice finished as top-scorer.

After much transfer speculation, Patterson signed for Bradford Park Avenue in July 2008, along with his ex-FC United strike partner, Stuart Rudd. Patterson was credited with a hat-trick during a pre-season tour game in Spain, but this later turned out to be a "wind-up" by club chairman Bob Blackburn. Patterson was on a family holiday in Majorca at the time of his game.

In 2009, Patterson signed for Droylsden after a season plagued by injury, though he still managed to get into double figures for Bradford PA. On 27 June 2009, Patterson left Droylsden to sign for IFA Premiership side Coleraine. On his debut for Coleraine in a friendly against Garvagh, he scored a first half hat-trick. He scored ten goals in eight pre-season friendlies for the Bannsiders before marking his competitive debut with a goal in the 2–2 draw with Linfield on 8 August 2009. He then went on to record a hat-trick in the 3–2 derby win over Ballymena United on 18 August.

On 7 November 2009, Patterson scored four times as Coleraine beat defending champions Glentoran 6–0 at The Oval. On 4 December 2009, Patterson was awarded with the Football Writers Player of the Month for November. On top of this, he also picked up Goal of the Month for his first of four goals against Glentoran. Patterson scored his first Irish Cup goal for Coleraine against IFA Championship 2 side Dundela. He finished the 2009/10 season having scored 41 goals for Coleraine, with 30 goals in the Premiership and the rest in various other competitions, and was named Ulster Footballer of the Year.

Patterson joined Glentoran in the summer of 2010, having signed a pre-contract agreement with the club earlier in the year. However, in June 2010, it was announced that Patterson had joined Plymouth Argyle, after impressing at a trial in March, and that an "undisclosed fee" had been agreed with Glentoran despite him never joining the Northern Irish club.

On 14 August 2010 he made his home debut as a first-half substitute in a match against Carlisle United. He scored a late goal in the 94th minute which allowed Plymouth Argyle to draw the match. Patterson returned to Northern Ireland in July 2011, joining Linfield on loan until the end of the 2011–12 season. Having scored four goals in 18 league matches by January 2012, Patterson ended his loan spell with Linfield to join Derry City on a two-year contract. His competitive debut for the club saw him score a hat-trick in a 4–0 defeat of Lisburn Distillery in the Setanta Cup.

In January 2015, Patterson signed for NPL Western Australia club Cockburn City, scoring 19 goals in 20 matches for the team.

In October 2015, seven years after leaving the club, Patterson returned to FC United of Manchester, for whom he remains the second highest goalscorer with 99 goals in all official competitions.

In December 2015 he signed for Derry City for a second time. In August 2018, he joined NIFL Premiership champions Crusaders.

In September 2019, Patterson joined Mid-Ulster Football League side Ballymacash Rangers. A key motive behind the move was to link up with former Linfield teammate Michael Gault, who managed Ballymacash at the time of Patterson's signing. Patterson departed the club one year later after 21 goals in 23 appearances, moving on to Ballymena & Provincial Football League side Belfast Celtic for the 2020–21 season. However, due to the COVID-19 pandemic, all football activity in Northern Ireland below the NIFL Premiership was cancelled, and Patterson moved to Premiership side Dungannon Swifts on 31 January 2021 without playing a competitive game for Belfast Celtic.

In August 2021 he joined Strabane Athletic and in October was appointed as player-manager.

International career
Patterson was involved with the Northern Ireland under 19 squad in 2002, however he accepted a call up to the Republic of Ireland under 19 squad to play in the European Championships in 2003. Before Patterson could join up with the squad, he was ruled out by injury. Patterson received his first call-up to the Northern Ireland squad in February 2010, when Nigel Worthington named him in his squad to face Albania and made his debut as a substitute, earning praise from manager Nigel Worthington for his performance. He was then named in the squad again in May 2010 for a two match tour and it was announced that he would play as a lone striker in a match against Turkey. He scored his first international goal, a penalty, on 17 November 2010 in a friendly against Morocco to level the scores late in the game, playing the full 90 minutes.

International goals

Honours 

FC United of Manchester
 Northern Premier League President's Cup: 2007–08
 North West Counties League Division One: 2006–07
 North West Counties League Challenge Cup: 2006–07
 North West Counties League Division Two: 2005–06
 Supporters Direct Cup: 2006
 Jimmy Davis Memorial Cup: 2007

Derry City
 FAI Cup: 2012

Crusaders
 Irish Cup: 2018–19
 County Antrim Shield: 2018–19

Individual
 Ulster Footballer of the Year: 2009–10
 PFAI Premier Division Team of the Year: 2013

References

External links
 
 

1984 births
Living people
Association footballers from Northern Ireland
Northern Ireland international footballers
Rochdale A.F.C. players
Radcliffe F.C. players
Mossley A.F.C. players
F.C. United of Manchester players
Bradford (Park Avenue) A.F.C. players
Droylsden F.C. players
Coleraine F.C. players
People from Strabane
Plymouth Argyle F.C. players
Linfield F.C. players
Derry City F.C. players
Crusaders F.C. players
English Football League players
Northern Premier League players
NIFL Premiership players
Northern Ireland Football Writers' Association Players of the Year
Ulster Footballers of the Year
League of Ireland players
National League (English football) players
Association football forwards
Dungannon Swifts F.C. players
Belfast Celtic F.C. players
Football managers from Northern Ireland
Ballymacash Rangers F.C. players
Strabane Athletic F.C. players
Strabane Athletic F.C. managers
Glentoran F.C. players